Vijaykumar Yo Mahesh (born 21 December 1987), is a former Indian cricketer who played for Tamil Nadu. He is a right-hand batsman and bowls with his right hand. He studied in St. Bede's Anglo Indian Higher Secondary School in Chennai.

He broke into the Indian U19 one-day squad for the series against Australia in September 2005 and played sufficiently well to retain his squad place for both the Afro-Asian Cup and the 2006 Under-19 Cricket World Cup in Sri Lanka.

In his ten U19 ODIs to date, he has taken 15 wickets with a strike rate of one wicket every 32 balls. Previously, from 2008 to 2010, he played for Delhi Daredevils in the IPL. He was then signed up by the Chennai Super Kings in 2011 and released after the end of IPL 2012. He took most wickets in the 2009–10 Vijay Hazare Trophy, India's domestic 50 over tournament. He can swing the ball both ways.

On 20 December 2020, Mahesh announced his retirement from all forms of cricket.

References

External links
 

1987 births
Chennai Super Kings cricketers
Delhi Capitals cricketers
Indian cricketers
Tamil Nadu cricketers
South Zone cricketers
India Blue cricketers
Living people